Marais des Cygnes (Swans marsh in English) may refer to:

 Marais des Cygnes massacre prior to the American Civil War
 Marais des Cygnes Massacre Memorial Park a Kansas state historic site near that commemorates the 1858 massacre of the same name
 Battle of Marais des Cygnes during the American Civil War
 Marais des Cygnes National Wildlife Refuge in Kansas in the United States
 Marais des Cygnes River in Kansas and Missouri in the United States

See also
 Marais (disambiguation)
 Cygnes (disambiguation)